Snowfinches are a group of small passerine birds in the sparrow family Passeridae. At one time all eight species were placed in the genus Montifringilla but they are now divided into three genera:

 Montifringilla (3 species)
 In Europe, the name snowfinch is sometimes used for the white-winged snowfinch specifically
 Pyrgilauda (4 species)
 White-rumped snowfinch, Onychostruthus taczanowskii

References

Birds by common name